"Hypnotized" is the fourth single released by the Japanese Eurodance group Shanadoo produced in Germany.

Information 
"Hypnotized" is the first original recording by Shanadoo. Previously Shanadoo's works have been Japanese covers of songs by the German dance act E-Rotic. The single also contains another song entitled "Heart to Heart", cover of E-Rotic's "Test My Best". "Hypnotized" already was released in the Japanese Version of their album Welcome to Tokyo. The single failed to catch much attention and peaked at a disappointing number 54 on the German top 100 singles chart. It managed also to chart in Austria, charting at 64. It is also featured on the new European re-release of the album Welcome to Tokyo and on Shanadoo's 2nd album The Symbol.

Music Tracks 

 "Hypnotized" (Radio Edit)
 "Hypnotized" (Remix)
 "Hypnotized" (Extended Version)
 "Heart to Heart" (Bonus Track)

2007 singles
J-pop songs
Eurodance songs
Songs written by David Brandes